BBC Brit is an entertainment subscription television channel featuring factual entertainment programming. The channel is wholly owned and operated by BBC Studios. Originally set to roll out internationally in 2014, it was later announced it would launch in 2015, starting in Poland.

History      
In October 2013, BBC announced that in 2014 they would roll out three new brands – BBC Earth, BBC First, and BBC Brit, with BBC Brit to be dedicated to entertainment programming. It was later announced that the content would largely be factual entertainment, featuring BBC series Top Gear with the possibility for increases in local adaptions of the series. Other series are to include Room 101 and Mock the Week.
It was also announced that roughly 50 hours, or roughly 5 series, of new content would be ordered for the new channel.

International roll-out

Poland
BBC Brit premiered in Poland on 1 February 2015, replacing BBC Entertainment.

Nordic Countries
BBC Brit replaced BBC Entertainment in Denmark, Norway, Sweden, Finland and Iceland on 13 April 2015. It will be replaced by BBC Nordic on 17 April 2023.

Africa  
The channel launched on DStv in Africa replacing BBC Entertainment on 1 September 2015.

Australia
BBC Brit and BBC Earth launched in Australia on 1 November 2019, through IPTV streaming service Fetch TV. Unlike other versions of the channel, this one is a video on demand service with selected programming accessible through the TV guide.

Singapore
The channel's content is offered exclusively on BBC Player Singapore (a local version of the BBC iPlayer service).

Malaysia
The channel's content is offered exclusively on BBC Player Malaysia (a local version of the BBC iPlayer service), which requires a valid unifi TV subscription to access it. In October 2021, BBC Brit contents will be available as SVOD contents on subscription TV provider Astro.

Programmes

References

External links

International BBC television channels
Television channels and stations established in 2015
Television channels in Poland
Pan-Nordic television channels
Television stations in South Africa
2015 establishments in the United Kingdom
BBC Worldwide